St Joseph's Co-Ed School is a school in Arera Colony of Bhopal, India.

History
St Joseph's co-ed school  was established in 1986 by Rev Dr Eugene D'Souza.

Campus
The school's campus is located in Bhopal's E-6 Arera Colony. It has a main playground with three other small playgrounds. There is a separate kindergarten building with an auditorium that is more like a room. It is the biggest school in Bhopal in terms of strength, with more than 5000 students. Each class is divided into seven sections.

Academics
The school has classes in English and Hindi mediums of instruction. It has classes from Standard nursery to XII.

Gallery

References

External links
 Official website

Catholic secondary schools in India
Primary schools in India
High schools and secondary schools in Madhya Pradesh
Christian schools in Madhya Pradesh
Schools in Bhopal
Educational institutions established in 1986
1986 establishments in Madhya Pradesh